MIFF may refer to:

Film festivals
 Listapad, aka Minsk International Film Festival, held each November in Minsk, Belarus
Maine International Film Festival, held in Waterville, Maine
Melbourne International Film Festival, held in Melbourne, Australia
Méliès International Festivals Federation, a network of 22 genre film festivals based in Brussels, Belgium
Miami International Film Festival, held in Miami, Florida, US
Milan International Film Festival, held in Milan, Italy
Moscow International Film Festival, held in Moscow, Russia
Mumbai International Film Festival, held in Mumbai, India

Other uses
Magick Image File Format, a digital image format

MIFF mine, a German anti-tank mine
Miff Mole (1898–1961), American jazz trombonist and band leader
With Israel for Peace, a Norwegian pro-Israel organisation